The lemon-throated leaf warbler (Phylloscopus cebuensis) is a species of Old World warbler in the family Phylloscopidae.

It is found in the Philippines (Cebu, Negros and Luzon).

References

lemon-throated leaf warbler
Endemic birds of the Philippines
lemon-throated leaf warbler
Taxonomy articles created by Polbot